On the afternoon of August 10, 2020, a large explosion occurred at a gas station in Volgograd, Russia. The explosion caused 13 injuries and could be felt thousands of meters away.

Explosion
On the afternoon of August 10, a large fire broke out at a gas station in Volgograd, Russia. Firefighters were called around 12:40 local time (8:40 UTC) to battle the blaze. The fire soon went out of control producing a large explosion. This explosion was accompanied by a shockwave which could be felt thousands of meters away. The shockwave knocked down firefighters and injured 13 people. Fortunately, all staff at the gas station were able to safely evacuate before the fire escalated. The explosion also caused a huge fireball which rose several meters into the air. It took 70 firefighters and a firefighting robot to finally extinguish the fire.

Footage
Video of the explosion soon became viral on social media networks. Some residents of the area ventured out to film the blast. The video was widely shared on YouTube in the days following the explosion.

See also
 1947 Texas City Disaster
 List of industrial disasters
 List of explosions

References

2020 disasters in Russia
2020 fires in Europe
August 2020 events in Russia
Explosions in 2020
Explosions in Russia
Fires in Russia
2020 explosion